Krasnaya Gorka (Qıźılyar) is a rural locality (a selo) and the administrative center of Nurimanovsky District of the Republic of Bashkortostan, Russia, located on the Ufa River. Population:

References

Rural localities in Nurimanovsky District